Sar Turehha (also Romanized as Sar Tūrehhā) is a village in Susan-e Sharqi Rural District, Susan District, Izeh County, Khuzestan Province, Iran. At the 2006 census, its population was 61, in 15 families.

References 

Populated places in Izeh County